Stéphane Degout (born 9 June 1975 in Bourg-en-Bresse) is a contemporary French baritone. He grew up in Saint-Jean-de-Niost (Ain) and has been living in Lyon since 1995.

Biography 
Trained at the lycée Saint-Exupéry in Lyon, the Conservatoire national supérieur de musique et de danse de Lyon in the class of Margreet Honig, then within the troupe of the opéra national de Lyon, Degout began his career in the role of Papageno in The Magic Flute, within the framework of the Académie européenne de musique of the Aix-en-Provence Festival in July 1998. He particularly attended the master classes of Régine Crespin, Gundula Janowitz, Graziella Sciutti and Claudio Desderi. He has been following Gary Magby's teaching from 1998.

Since then, he has been performing a varied repertoire at the Opéra national de Lyon, the Paris Opera, the Opéra-Comique, the Théâtre des Champs Elysées, the Théâtre Royal de la Monnaie in Brussels, the Opéra national de Montpellier, the Berlin State Opera, the Royal Opera House, Covent Garden in London, the Teatro alla Scala de Milan, the Metropolitan Opera of New York, the Lyric Opera of Chicago, the Theater an der Wien, the Dutch National Opera, the Aix-en-Provence International Lyric Art Festival, the Glyndebourne Festival Opera, the Edinburgh Festival, the Salzburg festival, the Verbier Festival, the Chorégies d'Orange, the Ravinia Festival, the Los Angeles Philharmonic, under the direction of René Jacobs, William Christie, Christophe Rousset, Emmanuelle Haïm, Marc Minkowski, Ivor Bolton, Bertrand de Billy, Sylvain Cambreling, Michel Plasson, Georges Prêtre, Jesus Lopez Cobos, Charles Dutoit, Kirill Petrenko, Pinchas Steinberg, Philippe Jordan, Daniel Harding, Simon Rattle, Riccardo Muti, Esa-Pekka Salonen, Raphaël Pichon and with the directors Stéphane Braunschweig, Laurent Pelly, Robert Carsen, Patrice Chéreau, Klaus Michael Grüber, Trisha Brown, Robert Wilson, Barrie Kosky, Torsten Fischer, Krzysztof Warlikowski, Olivier Py, Pierre Audi, Katie Mitchell.

He participated in the world premiere of the opera La Dispute (after Marivaux) by Benoît Mernier in March 2013 and also at the premiere of Philippe Boesmans's operas, Au monde in March/April 2014 at La Monnaie and Pinocchio in July 2017 at the Aix-en-Provence Festival.

Degout works on the repertoire of "lied" and the French melodie with Ruben Lifschitz and performs regularly in recital with pianists Hélène Lucas, Simon Lepper, Michaël Guido, Alain Planès and  Cédric Tiberghien in Paris, Lyon, Montpellier, Toulouse, Bordeaux, Strasbourg, Rouen, Grenoble, Lille, Nantes, Tours, Brussels, London, Edinburg, Berlin, Francfurt, Amsterdam, Venice, Rome, Vienna, New York and Chicago. He has recorded a first disc Mélodie for the Naïve Records label.

He has been represented since the beginning of his career by Peter Wiggins, Sofia Surgutchowa and Myriam Gamichon within IMG Artists, Paris.

Prizes 
 2012: Lyric artist of the year of the Victoires de la musique classique
 2006: Gabriel Dussurget Prize, Aix-en-Provence Festival
 2002: Second prize in the Placido Domingo competition/Operalia
 1998: Fifth prize in the France Télécom competition "Les Voix nouvelles"

Distinction 
 24 September 2012: Named chevalier in the ordre des Arts et des Lettres

Repertoire (opera, recital and oratorio) 
 Johann Sebastian Bach: Jesus, St Matthew Passion
 Hector Berlioz: Claudio, Béatrice et Bénédict; Chorèbe, Les Troyens
 Benjamin Britten: Junius, The Rape of Lucretia; Novice’s friend, Billy Budd; Sid, Albert Herring
 Philippe Boesmans: Ori, Au monde (premiere 2014); The director of the troupe, Pinocchio (premiere 2017)
 Johannes Brahms: Requiem
 Marc-Antoine Charpentier: Oronte, Médée
 Ernest Chausson: Poème de l'amour et de la mer
 Francesco Bartolomeo Conti: Don Chisciotte, Don Chisciotte in Sierra Morena
 François Couperin: Ariane Consolée par Bacchus
 Claude Debussy: Pelléas, Pelléas et Mélisande
 Gabriel Fauré: Requiem
 Christoph Willibald Ritter von Gluck: Oreste, Iphigénie en Tauride; Le Grand Prêtre et Herlcule, Alceste
 Charles Gounod: Mercutio, Roméo et Juliette
 Joseph Haydn: Orlando, Orlando Paladino
 Erich Wolfgang Korngold: Franck et Fritz, Die tote Stadt
 Ruggero Leoncavallo: Silvio, Pagliacci
 Gustav Mahler: des Knaben Wunderhorn,  Kindertotenlieder
 Jules Massenet: Albert, Werther
 Felix Mendelssohn: Elijah, Elijah
 Benoît Mernier: The Prince, La Dispute (premiere)
 Olivier Messiaen: Frère Léon, Saint François d'Assise
 Claudio Monteverdi: Orfeo, L'Orfeo ; Ulisse, Il ritorno d'Ulisse in patria
 Mozart: Papageno, Die Zauberflöte; Guglielmo, Così fan tutte; Conte Almaviva, Le Nozze di Figaro; Don Giovanni, Don Giovanni
 Jacques Offenbach: Jupiter, Orphée aux Enfers
 Giacomo Puccini: Schaunard, La Bohème
 Jean-Philippe Rameau: Borilée and Adamas, Les Boréades; Adario, les Indes Galantes; Thésée, Hippolyte et Aricie
 Maurice Ravel: l’Horloge et le Chat, L'Enfant et les Sortilèges
 Gioachino Rossini: Dandini, La Cenerentola; Raimbaud, Le Comte Ory
 Johann Strauss II: Gabriel von Eisenstein, La Chauve-Souris
 Richard Strauss: Harlekin, Ariadne auf Naxos
 Ambroise Thomas: Hamlet, Hamlet
 Richard Wagner: Wolfram von Eschenbach, Tannhäuser
 Mélodies and Lieder by Hector Berlioz, Johannes Brahms, Ernest Chausson, Claude Debussy, Henri Duparc, Gabriel Fauré, Franz Liszt, Gustav Mahler, Francis Poulenc, Maurice Ravel, Franz Schubert, Robert Schumann, Richard Strauss, Hugo Wolf.

References

External links 
 Stéphane Degout at IMG Artists
 : discography
 Stéphane Degout on Discogs
 RAVEL : Chansons Madécasses - Stéphane Degout on YouTube

1975 births
Living people
People from Bourg-en-Bresse
French operatic baritones
Chevaliers of the Ordre des Arts et des Lettres
20th-century French male opera singers
21st-century French male opera singers